The 2014–15 AHL season was the 79th season of the American Hockey League. The regular season began in October 2014 and ended in April 2015. The 2015 Calder Cup playoffs followed the conclusion of the regular season.

Team and NHL affiliation changes

Relocations
The Adirondack Phantoms relocated to Allentown, Pennsylvania, to play as the Lehigh Valley Phantoms.
The Abbotsford Heat relocated to Glens Falls, New York, after the City of Abbotsford terminated their lease agreement with the Calgary Flames. The team became the Adirondack Flames and played out of the Glens Falls Civic Center.

On July 9, 2014, the President of the AHL announced a realignment for the 2014–15 season. Eastern Conference changes include the Lehigh Valley Phantoms relocation and swapping to the East Division from the Northeast Division with the Syracuse Crunch. Western Conference changes include the Lake Erie Monsters moving from the North Division to the Midwest Division, and the Iowa Wild moving from the Midwest to the West Division due to the Adirondack Flames relocation in to the North Division

Rule changes
Overtime was extended to seven minutes. Following the first whistle beyond the first three minutes, both teams are reduced further from four to three men on the ice.
Shootouts switched to the NHL format of three skaters a side.
If a goaltender deliberately knocks the goal out of place during a breakaway, the goaltender shall be ejected from the game, and the backup goaltender will be required to face a penalty shot against any player of the opposing team's choosing. This rule was imposed midseason after Bridgeport Sound Tigers goaltender David Leggio knocked his goal out of place during a 2-on-0 breakaway, determining (correctly) that the penalty shot he would face under then-current rules would have been easier to defend than the 2-on-0 breakaway he was facing.

Standings 
 indicates team has clinched division and a playoff spot
 indicates team has clinched a playoff spot
 indicates team has been eliminated from playoff contention

Eastern Conference

Western Conference

Statistical leaders

Leading skaters 
The following players are sorted by points, then goals. Updated as of April 18, 2015.

GP = Games played; G = Goals; A = Assists; Pts = Points; +/– = Plus-minus; PIM = Penalty minutes

Leading goaltenders 
The following goaltenders with a minimum 1500 minutes played lead the league in goals against average. Updated as of April 19, 2015.

GP = Games played; TOI = Time on ice (in minutes); SA = Shots against; GA = Goals against; SO = Shutouts; GAA = Goals against average; SV% = Save percentage; W = Wins; L = Losses; OT = Overtime/shootout loss

Calder Cup playoffs

AHL awards

All-Star Teams
First All-Star Team
Matt Murray (G)
Brad Hunt (D)
Chris Wideman (D)
Chris Bourque (LW)
Andy Miele (C)
Teemu Pulkkinen (RW)

Second All-Star Team
Jacob Markstrom (G)
Colin Miller (D)
Bobby Sanguinetti (D)
Shane Prince (LW)
Jordan Weal (C)
Brian O'Neill (RW)

All-Rookie Team
Matt Murray (G)
Ville Pokka (D)
Ryan Pulock (D)
Viktor Arvidsson (F)
Connor Brown (F)
Charles Hudon (F)

Milestones

See also
List of AHL seasons
2014 in ice hockey
2015 in ice hockey

References

External links
AHL official site

 
American Hockey League seasons
2
2